Terpinen-4-ol is an isomer of terpineol with the chemical formula C10H18O. A primary constituent of tea tree oil, it is obtained as an extract from the leaves, branches, and bark of Melaleuca alternifolia Cheel. Despite considerable basic and preliminary clinical research of terpinen-4-ol and tea tree oil, its biological properties and potential for clinical uses have not been established as of 2019. It may be a factor in the contact dermatitis of tea tree oil when used topically.

Terpinen-4-ol occurs in Juniperus communis and is thought to be the reason why this wood is highly resistant to rot.

Additional images

References

Monoterpenes
Cyclohexenols